John Thomas Wilder built several houses for his family and wife, Martha Jane Stewart, which are still in existence, and at least two have historic markers.

The John T. Wilder House in Roan Mountain, Tennessee, United States, was one of the homes of John T. Wilder, the Union Army general and industrialist who built the Cloudland Hotel on Roan Mountain. The house was listed on the National Register of Historic Places in 1986. It is one of two homes on Main Street in Roan Mountain that Wilder built.

The General John T. Wilder House in Knoxville is another of Wilder's homes that is listed on the National Register.

Another house is located in Greensburg, Indiana. See https://www.in.gov/history/markers/414.htm.

References

Further reading 
 

Houses completed in 1884
Houses in Carter County, Tennessee
Houses on the National Register of Historic Places in Tennessee
Italianate architecture in Tennessee
Roan Mountain, Tennessee
National Register of Historic Places in Carter County, Tennessee